
Highway 61 may refer to:

 Highway 61 Revisited, 1965 album by Bob Dylan
"Highway 61 Revisited" (song), the title track from the album
 Highway 61 (film), 1991 film by Bruce McDonald
Highway 61 (soundtrack), the accompanying album soundtrack to Bruce McDonald's film
 Highway 61 Motorcycle Club, an outlaw motorcycle club founded in New Zealand
 US Route 61, also known as "The Blues Highway", from which the song, album and film are based

See also
 List of highways numbered 61
 Route 61 (disambiguation)